Clark station is an under-construction railway station located on the North–South Commuter Railway in Pampanga, Philippines.

The station is being constructed as part of the second phase of the North–South Commuter Railway.

History
A rail link from Clark International Airport to Metro Manila was originally planned in the 1990s. The first proposal, called the "Manila–Clark rapid railway system", was discontinued due to disagreement on funding. In the early 2000s, the NorthRail project was pursued. This involved the conversion the rail gauge from narrow gauge to standard gauge, and linking Manila to Malolos, Bulacan and eventually to Clark and its airport. The project was discontinued in 2011 due to allegations of overpricing, and was replaced by the current North–South Commuter Railway project.

References

Philippine National Railways stations
Railway stations in Pampanga
Proposed railway stations in the Philippines